is a Japanese football player who plays as Goalkeeper. He currently play for Machida Zelvia.

Career
After attending Nippon Sport Science University, Fukui joined FC Machida Zelvia first as a special designated player and then as a top team member in 2018.

Career statistics

Club
Updated to the start of 2023 season.

References

External links

Profile at J. League
Profile at Machida Zelvia

1995 births
Living people
Association football people from Kanagawa Prefecture
Japanese footballers
J2 League players
FC Machida Zelvia players
Association football goalkeepers